Peter Michael Maitlis, FRS (15 January 1933 – 18 May 2022) was a British organometallic chemist.

Early life and education
Maitlis was born on 15 January 1933, and educated at Hendon School (then Hendon County School) in north London 1944–50. He was awarded a Bachelor's degree in Science from the University of Birmingham, and a PhD (1956, studying under Professor Michael J. S. Dewar, who helped to develop the Dewar–Chatt–Duncanson model for bonding in organometallic compounds) and a DSc (1970) from the University of London.

Career
After completing his doctorate, Maitlis worked as an Assistant Lecturer at the University of London. He undertook postdoctoral study at Cornell University as a Fulbright Fellow (1960–1961) and then as a research fellow at Harvard University (1961–1962) under F. G. A. Stone.

While working and teaching at McMaster University in Hamilton, Ontario (1962–1972), he rose from Assistant Professor to a full Professorship. Returning to the United Kingdom in 1972, Maitlis was a professor of chemistry at the University of Sheffield for 30 years until his appointment as an emeritus professor in 2002.

In 1971, he published two volumes on the organic chemistry of palladium which were "widely recognised as the most authoritative account of the organo-complexes of this metal".

Maitlis was elected a Fellow of the Royal Society in 1984. The citation highlights his work on the platinum group metals palladium, rhodium and iridium.

Achievements in organometallic chemistry
The hexafluorophosphate ion is generally considered inert and hence a suitable counterion in organometallic synthesis. However, Maitlis' work has demonstrated a solvolysis reaction of the hexafluorophosphate ion. The tris(solvent) rhodium complex [(η5-C5Me5)Rh(Me2CO)3](PF6)2 undergoes solvolysis when heated in acetone, forming a difluorophosphate-bridged complex [(η5-C5Me5)Rh(μ-OPF2O)3Rh(η5-C5Me5)]PF6.

Hexamethyl Dewar benzene (C6Me6) undergoes an unusual rearrangement reaction with hydrohalic acids to form a pentamethylcyclopentadiene derivative, and consequently can be used as a starting material for synthesising some pentamethylcyclopentadienyl organometallic compounds.

Maitlis and colleagues demonstrated this synthesis and its applicability to the iridium analogue, [(η5-C5Me5)IrCl2]2. His group also demonstrated a more convenient synthesis for the bright orange, air-stable diamagnetic iridium reagent using pentamethylcyclopentadiene.

Isocyanides can serve as ligands in co-ordination chemistry as a result of the lone electron pair on carbon, and are especially useful with metals in the 0, +1, and +2 oxidation states. In particular, Maitlis has demonstrated that tert-butyl isocyanide can stabilise metals in unusual oxidation states, such as palladium(I) in the complex [(t-BuNC)2Pd(μ-Cl)]2.

Metallomesogens
Metallomesogens are "metal complexes of organic ligands which exhibit liquid crystalline (mesomorphic) character [and thus they] combine the variety and range of metal-based coordination chemistry with the extraordinary physical properties exhibited by liquid crystals." They have been a research interest of Maitlis' group since the mid-1980s, and in fact Maitlis jointly directed the early investigations of these systems in the UK and actually coined the term metallomesogen.

Personal life
Maitlis was Jewish. He was the father of the journalist and newsreader Emily Maitlis.

He died on 18 May 2022, at the age of 89.

Most cited publications
The following list shows the top 10 most cited journal articles by Maitlis according to Web of Science data. The number of citations indicated is current as at 27 May 2022:

 --- 657 citations
 --- 570 citations
 --- 482 citations
Maitlis, P. M.; Haynes, A.; Sunley, G. J.; Howard, M. J. (1996). "Methanol Carbonylation Revisited: Thirty Years On". J. Chem.Soc., Dalton Trans. (11): 2187–2196. doi:10.1039/dt9960002187. --- 276 citations
 --- 265 citations
 --- 247 citations
 --- 240 citations
 --- 230 citations
Maitlis, P. M. (1981). "Eta-5-Cyclopentadienyl and eta-6-Arene as Protecting Ligands Towards Platinum-Metal Complexes". Chem. Soc. Rev. 10 (1): 1–48. doi:10.1039/cs9811000001. --- 207 citations
 --- 196 citations

References

1933 births
2022 deaths
British Jews
British people of German-Jewish descent
British chemists
Academics of the University of Sheffield
Jewish scientists
Fellows of the Royal Society
Academic staff of McMaster University
Cornell University alumni
Harvard University alumni
Alumni of the University of Birmingham
Jewish chemists